Tymbarcha cerinopa is a species of moth of the family Tortricidae. It is commonly found in Eastern India (Assam).

The wingspan of this moth is about 13 mm. The forewings are whitish-ochreous, the veins more ochreous, strewn with small tufts of scales finely sprinkled with blackish, tending to be arranged in transverse series. The basal patch, a narrow central fascia starting from a small whitish spot on the costa, and a streak along the posterior part of the costa and termen are suffusedly glistening silvery-whitish. The hindwings are pale whitish-grey-ochreous.

References

Moths described in 1908
Tortricini
Moths of Asia
Taxa named by Edward Meyrick